Nelson Airport (Māori: Te Papa Waka Rererangi o Whakatū)  is located  south-west of central Nelson, New Zealand, in the suburb of Annesbrook. Approximately 1.2 million passengers and visitors use the airport terminal annually. Passenger numbers for the 2017 financial year were 1,000,373, up from 865,203 in 2016.

It is the sixth-busiest airport in New Zealand by passenger numbers and seventh by aircraft movements, as well as being the busiest New Zealand airport without any scheduled international service. The airport has an Air New Zealand Koru Lounge.

History

Construction of Nelson Airport commenced in 1937. In 2006, the airport received restricted international airport status and it has handled international private jets since then. The airport averages 60 commercial flights per day. The Airport precinct is home to 35 aeronautical and support businesses.

Nelson airport is the home base of Air Nelson operating under the Air NZ Link banner, which operates a fleet of 23 Bombardier Dash 8 Q300s on national air routes. Air New Zealand, Air Nelson's parent airline, recently expanded its Nelson base, investing 30 million dollars to develop the engineering and technical workshops. Air New Zealand then announced the Air Nelson maintenance facility would also handle fellow subsidiary Mount Cook Airline's fleet of ATR 72-600 aircraft.

The airport has a single terminal building with 9 tarmac gates. A further 7 remote gates are located adjacent to the terminal.

In 2014, Nelson City Council deemed the main terminal of Nelson Airport an earthquake risk and at fault of possible liquefaction. The airport has been granted 10 years to upgrade the terminal to meet current building standards. The Nelson Airport management on 8 September 2015 have decided to rebuild the terminal instead of renovating the existing complex as this will best meet the growth needs in the future. It was also announced that due to increased airline activity strong passenger growth could be expected over the next two years. It is estimated that by the end of 2017 there could be more than 1 million passengers per annum and over 300 flights per week at the airport.

On 6 December 2017, the airport inaugurated 270 new parking spaces and new exit barrier arms (the latter located near Air New Zealand's hangar on Trent Drive) in order to help with traffic flow during the development and expansion phase mentioned above.

Nelson Airport propose to extend the main runway to the north by 150m stating that it's one of the shortest runways in the world for the type of aircraft serving the airport and the current runway restricts payload on flights.

Airlines and destinations

Statistics

See also

 List of airports in New Zealand
 List of airlines of New Zealand
 Transport in New Zealand
 List of busiest airports in New Zealand

References

External links

Airports in New Zealand
Buildings and structures in Nelson, New Zealand
Nelson, New Zealand
Government-owned companies of New Zealand
Transport in the Nelson Region
Transport buildings and structures in the Nelson Region